Marcin Kokoszka (born February 23, 1984, in Świebodzice) is a Polish footballer who last played for Olimpia Grudziądz.

Career

Club
In June 2011, he joined Olimpia Grudziądz.

References

External links
 

1984 births
Living people
People from Świebodzice
Polish footballers
Odra Wodzisław Śląski players
Górnik Polkowice players
Olimpia Grudziądz players
Sportspeople from Lower Silesian Voivodeship
Association football defenders